Norbert is a Germanic given name, from nord "north" and berht "bright". Norbert is also occasionally found as a surname.

People with the given name

Academia
 Norbert Angermann (born 1936), German historian
 Norbert A’Campo (born 1941), Swiss mathematician
 Norbert Berkowitz (1924–2001), Canadian scientist
 Norbert Bischofberger (born 1954), Austrian scientist
 Norbert Bolz (born 1953), German philosopher
 Norbert Elias (1897–1990), German Jewish sociologist
 Norbert Fuhr (born 1956), German computer scientist
 Norbert Geng (born 1965), German legal scholar
 Norbert Guterman (1900–1984), American translator
 Norbert von Hellingrath (1888-1916), German literary scholar 
 Norbert Hirschhorn (born 1938), American physician
 Norbert Hornstein, American linguist
 Norbert Jokl (1877–1942?), Austrian Jewish linguist
 Norbert Klatt (born 1949), German religious scholar
 Norbert Leser (1933–2014), Austrian political scientist
 Norbert Lynton (1927–2007), British art historian
 Norbert Rillieux (1806-1894), American inventor and engineer
 Norbert M. Samuelson (1936-2022), American Jewish philosopher
 Norbert Wiener (1894-1964), American mathematician and philosopher

Arts and literature
 Norbert Francis Attard (born 1951), Maltese artist
 Norbert Balatsch (born 1928), Austrian conductor and choirmaster
 Norbert Bisky (born 1970), German painter
 Norbert Blei (1935–2013), American writer
 Norbert Brainin (1923–2005), Austrian Jewish violinist
 Norbert Brodine (1896–1970), American cinematographer
 Norbert Brunner (artist) (born 1969), Austrian artist
 Norbert Burgmüller (1810–1836), German composer
 Norbert Leo Butz (born 1967), American actor
 Norbert Christian (1925–1976), German actor
 Norbert Daum (born 1948), Austrian musician
 Norbert Davis (1909–1949), American writer
 Norbert Falk (1872–1932), Austrian screenwriter
 Norbert Frýd (1913–1976), Czech writer
 Norbert Gastell (1929-2015), German voice actor
 Norbert Glanzberg (1910–2001), French Jewish composer
 Norbert Goeneutte (1854–1894), French illustrator
 Norbert Grund (1717–1767), Czech painter
 Norbert Hummelt (born 1962), German poet
 Norbert Jacques (1880–1954), Luxembourgish novelist
 Norbert Klassen (1941–2011), German performance artist
 Norbert Kox (born 1945), American artist
 Norbert Kraft (born 1950), Canadian musician
 Norbert Kricke (1922–1984), German sculptor
 Norbert Krief (born 1956), French musician
 Norbert Kuchinke (1940–2013), German actor
 Norbert Kückelmann (born 1952), German film director
 Norbert H. J. Nozy (born 1952), Belgian musician
 Norbert Weisser (born 1946), German actor

Politics
 Norbert Aleksiewicz (1948–1994), Polish politician
 Norbert Barlicki (1880–1941), Polish politician
 Norbert Barthle (born 1952), German politician
 Norbert Blüm (1935–2020), German politician
 Norbert Darabos (born 1964), Austrian politician
 Norbert Dumas (1812–1869), French Canadian politician
 Norbert Dumont, Luxembourgish politician
 Norbert Erdős (born 1972), Hungarian politician
 Norbert Geis (born 1939), German politician
 Norbert Glante (born 1952), German politician
 Norbert Haupert (born 1940), Luxembourgish politician
 Norbert van Heyst, senior commander in the German Army, one of the principal commanders of War in Afghanistan as the leader of International Security Assistance Force
Norbert Hofer (born 1971), Austrian politician
 Norbert Hougardy (1909–1985), Belgian politician
 Norbert Keenan (1864–1954), Australian politician
 Norbert Klein (politician) (1956-2021), Dutch politician
 Norbert Lammert (born 1948), German politician
 Norbert Loizeau, Seychellois politician
 Norbert Mamangy, Malagasy politician
 Norbert Röttgen (born 1965), German politician

Religion
 Norbert of Xanten (c. 1080–1134), Roman Catholic bishop and saint
 Norbert Brunner (born 1942), Swiss Roman Catholic bishop
 Norbert D'Souza, Indian Roman Catholic leader
 Norbert Dorsey (1929–2013), American Roman Catholic bishop
 Norbert Felix Gaughan (1921–1999), American Roman Catholic bishop
 Norbert Klein (1866–1933), Czech Roman Catholic bishop

Sports
 Norbert Alblas (born 1994), Dutch footballer
 Norbert Balogh (born 1996), Hungarian footballer
 Norbert Beuls (1957–2014), Belgian footballer
 Norbert Brami (born 1937), Tunisian fencer
 Norbert Brige (born 1964), French athlete
 Norbert Csernyánszki (born 1976), Hungarian footballer
 Norbert Csiki (born 1991), Hungarian footballer
 Norbert Csölle (born 1992), Hungarian footballer
 Norbert Callens (1924–2005), Belgian cyclist
 Norbert Dickel (born 1961), German footballer
 Norbert Dobeleit (born 1964), German athlete
 Norbert Domnik (born 1964), Austrian triathlete
 Norbert Dürpisch (born 1952), German cyclist
 Norbert Düwel (born 1968), German football manager
 Norbert Eder (1955–2019), German footballer
 Norbert Eilenfeldt (born 1956), German footballer
 Norbert Eschmann (1933–2009), French-Swiss footballer
 Norbert Ettner (born 1977), German shooter
 Norbert Farkas (alpine skier) (born 1992), Hungarian alpine skier
 Norbert Farkas (footballer born 1977), Hungarian footballer
 Norbert Farkas (footballer born 1992), Hungarian footballer
 Norbert Felsinger (born 1939), Austrian figure skater
 Norbert Gombos (born 1990), Slovak tennis player
 Norbert Grudzinski (born 1977), German footballer
 Norbert Gyömbér (born 1992), Slovak footballer
 Norbert Hahn (born 1954), German luger
 Norbert Hajdú (born 1982), Hungarian footballer
 Norbert Hauata (born 1979), French Polynesian football referee
 Norbert Haug (born 1952), German motorsport executive
 Norbert Hayes (1896–1945), American football player
 Norbert Heffler (born 1995), Hungarian footballer
 Norbert Hof (born 1944), Austrian footballer
 Norbert Hofmann (footballer, born 1951), German footballer
 Norbert Hofmann (footballer, born 1972), German footballer
 Norbert Holzknecht (born 1976), Austrian alpine skier
 Norbert Holík (born 1972), Slovak paralympian
 Norbert Hosnyánszky (born 1984), Hungarian water polo player
 Norbert Hrnčár (born 1970), Slovak football player
 Norbert Huber (born 1964), Italian luger
 Norbert Huda (born 1950), German diver
 Norbert Janzon (born 1950), German footballer
 Norbert Jaskot (born 1971), Polish fencer
 Norbert Kalucza (born 1986), Hungarian boxer
 Norbert Kerckhove (1932–2006), Belgian cyclist
 Norbert Kerényi (born 1976), Hungarian footballer
 Norbert Keßlau (born 1962), German rower
 Norbert Klaar (born 1954), German shooter
 Norbert Kovács (footballer) (born 1977), Hungarian footballer
 Norbert Kovács (swimmer) (born 1988), Hungarian swimmer
 Norbert Kállai (born 1984), Hungarian footballer
 Norbert König (born 1958), German sports presenter
 Norbert Könyves (born 1989), Hungarian footballer
 Norbert Lattenstein (born 1984), Hungarian footballer
 Norbert Lichtenegger (born 1951), Austrian footballer
 Norbert Lipusz (born 1986), Hungarian footballer
 Norbert Madaras (born 1979), Hungarian water polo player
 Norbert Magosi (born 1975), Hungarian motorcyclist
 Norbert Manyande (born 1979), Zimbabwean cricketer
 Norbert Nachtweih (born 1957), German footballer 
 Norbert Nigbur (born 1948), German footballer 
 Norbert "Nobby" Stiles (1942-2020), English footballer
 Norbert Thimm (born 1949), German basketball player

Other fields
 Norbert Casteret (1897–1987), French cave explorer
 Norbert Denef (born 1949), German victim's advocate
 Norbert Holl, German diplomat
 Norbert Holm (1895–1962), German soldier
 Norbert Kröcher (born 1950), German left-wing revolutionary
 Norbert Lossau (born 1962), German librarian

People with the surname
 Guillaume Norbert (born 1980), French footballer
 Ludwig Norbert (born 1983), French footballer

See also
 Hurricane Norbert (disambiguation)
 Norberto
 Norbit
 St. Norbert (disambiguation)

Germanic given names
Czech masculine given names
Danish masculine given names
Dutch masculine given names
French masculine given names
German masculine given names
Hungarian masculine given names
Norwegian masculine given names
Polish masculine given names
Swedish masculine given names